Karakala may refer to:
Karakala, Armavir, Armenia
Karakala, Kotayk, Armenia
Karakala, Lori, Armenia
Sevaberd, Armenia
Karakala, Azerbaijan
Caracal, Romania
Garrygala, Turkmenistan, formerly Kara-Kala